Rabbi Jacob Joseph Oettinger ( 1780 – 1860), a native of Glogau, acted as the final chief rabbi of Berlin between 1825 and 1860, and served for some time as the dean of Berlin's rabbinical college. Oettinger was also known as an opponent of Leopold Zunz.

References

1780 births
1860 deaths
People from Głogów
19th-century Polish rabbis
Rabbis from Berlin